The Hoyt House, in 204 Gallatin St. in Thompson Falls in Sanders County, Montana, was built in 1914.  It was listed on the National Register of Historic Places in 1986.

It is a one-and-a-half-story bungalow with narrow lap siding.  It has a full width front porch, supported by four square columns, under its hipped roof.

It was originally owned by Randolph R. Hoyt, who came to Thompson Falls in 1907 and became co-owner the Thompson Hotel in 1909

References

Houses on the National Register of Historic Places in Montana
Houses completed in 1914
National Register of Historic Places in Sanders County, Montana
1914 establishments in Montana
Bungalow architecture in Montana
Thompson Falls, Montana